Commonground/MGS (CGMGS) is an independent marketing communications agency in the United States. Headquartered in New York with offices in Miami, Chicago, Houston, and Los Angeles, the Minority Business Enterprise specializes in minority, multicultural, urban and youth markets.

History
In 2014, eight independent agencies and companies - commonground, MGSCOMM, SWAY Public Relations, CG Works, Post Master and Run Wild Productions - came together under the umbrella of a holding group to form Commonground/MGS (CGMGS).  The holding group houses five autonomous agencies/companies operating under their own name: CGMGS, CG Works, Post Master, Run Wild Productions and SWAY Public Relations led by Founding Partners Ahmad Islam, Al Garcia-Serra, Manuel E. Machado, and Sherman Wright.

References

External links 
 

Advertising agencies of the United States